The 2020 Los Angeles Angels season was the 60th season of the Angels franchise in the American League and the 55th in Anaheim. The Angels were managed by Joe Maddon, in his first season as manager of the Angels. The Angels played their home games at Angel Stadium as members of Major League Baseball's American League West Division. Los Angeles opened the season on July 24 at the Oakland Athletics and finished the season at the Los Angeles Dodgers.

The Angels finished the season 26–34 to finish in fourth place in the division.

The season was shortened to a 60-game schedule due to the ongoing COVID-19 pandemic.

Previous season 
The Angels finished the 2019 season 72–90 to finish in last place in the West Division. On September 30, 2019, the Angels fired manager Brad Ausmus after only one season with the Angels.

Coaching changes 
After the club had fired Ausmus, speculation increased that the Angels would hire Joe Maddon, who had previously a bench coach with the Angels and spent 20 years in the Angels' system. On October 16, the Angels named Maddon the team's new manager.

COVID-19 effects on season 
On March 12, 2020, MLB announced that because of the ongoing COVID-19 pandemic, the start of the regular season would be delayed by at least two weeks in addition to the remainder of spring training being cancelled. Four days later, it was announced that the start of the season would be pushed back indefinitely due to the recommendation made by the CDC to restrict events of more than 50 people for eight weeks. On June 23, commissioner Rob Manfred unilaterally implemented a 60-game season. Players reported to training camps on July 1 in order to resume spring training and prepare for a July 24 Opening Day.

Regular season

Game log

|- style="background:#fbb;"
| 1 || July 24 || @ Athletics || 3–7  || Smith (1–0) || Robles (0–1) || — || 0–1 || L1
|- style="background:#cfc;"
| 2 || July 25 || @ Athletics || 4–1 || Bundy (1–0) || Manaea (0–1) || Robles (1) || 1–1 || W1
|- style="background:#fbb;"
| 3 || July 26 || @ Athletics || 4–6 || Petit (1–0) || Ohtani (0–1) || Hendriks (1) || 1–2 || L1
|- style="background:#fbb;"
| 4 || July 27 || @ Athletics || 0–3 || Smith (2–0) || Canning (0–1) || Soria (1) || 1–3 || L2
|- style="background:#cfc;"
| 5 || July 28 || Mariners || 10–2 || Buchter (1–0) || Sheffield (0–1) || — || 2–3 || W1
|- style="background:#fbb;"
| 6 || July 29 || Mariners || 7–10 || Shaw (1–0) || Barnes (0–1) || Altavilla (1) || 2–4 || L1
|- style="background:#fbb;"
| 7 || July 30 || Mariners || 5–8 || Gonzales (1–1) || Bundy (1–1) || — || 2–5 || L2
|- style="background:#fbb;"
| 8 || July 31 || Astros || 6–9 || Bielak (2–0) || Andriese (0–1) || Scrubb (1) || 2–6 || L3
|-

|- style="background:#cfc;"
| 9 || August 1 || Astros || 5–4  || Buchter (2–0) || Rodríguez (0–1) || — || 3–6 || W1
|- style="background:#fbb;"
| 10 || August 2 || Astros || 5–6  || Taylor (1–0) || Barnes (0–2) || — || 3–7 || L1
|- style="background:#cfc;"
| 11 || August 4 || @ Mariners || 5–3 || Heaney (1–0) || Dunn (0–1) || Buttrey (1) || 4–7 || W1
|- style="background:#fbb;"
| 12 || August 5 || @ Mariners || 6–7 || Gonzales (2–1) || Teherán (0–1) || Edwards Jr. (1) || 4–8 || L1
|- style="background:#cfc;"
| 13 || August 6 || @ Mariners || 6–1 || Bundy (2–1) || Walker (1–2) || — || 5–8 || W1
|- style="background:#fbb;"
| 14 || August 7 || @ Rangers || 3–4 || Lyles (1–1) || Canning (0–2) || Montero (1) || 5–9 || L1
|- style="background:#fbb;"
| 15 || August 8 || @ Rangers || 0–2 || Vólquez (1–1) || Sandoval (0–1) || Montero (2) || 5–10 || L2
|- style="background:#fbb;"
| 16 || August 9 || @ Rangers || 3–7 || Lynn (2–0) || Heaney (1–1) || — || 5–11 || L3
|- style="background:#cfc;"
| 17 || August 10 || Athletics || 10–9 || Peña (1–0) || Petit (1–1) || Buttrey (2) || 6–11 || W1
|- style="background:#cfc;"
| 18 || August 11 || Athletics || 6–0 || Bundy (3–1) || Fiers (1–1) || — || 7–11 || W2
|- style="background:#fbb;"
| 19 || August 12 || Athletics || 4–8 || Bassitt (2–0) || Canning (0–3) || — || 7–12 || L1
|- style="background:#fbb;"
| 20 || August 14 || Dodgers || 4–7 || Kershaw (2–1) || Sandoval (0–2) || Jansen (5) || 7–13 || L2
|- style="background:#fbb;"
| 21 || August 15 || Dodgers || 5–6  ||McGee (2–0) ||Middleton (0–1) || Jansen (6)  || 7–14 || L3
|- style="background:#fbb;"
| 22 || August 16 || Dodgers || 3–8 || Alexander (1–0) || Teherán (0–2) || — || 7–15 || L4
|- style="background:#cfc;"
| 23 || August 17 || Giants || 7–6 || Buttrey (1–0) || Gott (1–2) || — || 8–15 || W1
|- style="background:#fbb;"
| 24 || August 18 || Giants || 2–8 || García (1–1) || Bundy (3–2) || — || 8–16 || L1
|- style="background:#fbb;"
| 25 || August 19 || @ Giants || 2–7 || Cueto (2–0) || Sandoval (0–3) || — || 8–17 || L2
|- style="background:#fbb;"
| 26 || August 20 || @ Giants || 5–10 || Gausman (1–1) || Suárez (0–1) || — || 8–18 || L3
|- style="background:#fbb;"
| 27 || August 21 || @ Athletics || 3–5 || Fiers (3–1) || Heaney (1–2) || Hendriks (9) || 8–19 || L4
|- style="background:#cfc;"
| 28 || August 22 || @ Athletics || 4–3 || Andriese (1–1) || Bassitt (2–1) || Buttrey (3) || 9–19 || W1
|- style="background:#fbb;"
| 29 || August 23 || @ Athletics || 4–5  || Hendriks (2–0) || Buttrey (1–1) || — || 9–20 || L1
|- style="background:#fbb;"
| 30 || August 24 || @ Astros || 4–11 || Valdez (3–2) || Sandoval (0–4) || — || 9–21 || L2
|- style="background:#fbb;"
| 31 || August 25  || @ Astros || 3–6  || Javier (3–1) || Suárez (0–2) || Pressly (4) || 9–22 || L3
|- style="background:#cfc;"
| 32 || August 25  || @ Astros || 12–5  || Peña (2–0) || Bielak (3–2) || — || 10–22 || W1
|- style="background:#bbb;"
| — || August 26 || @ Astros || colspan=7 | Postponed (Hurricane Laura); Makeup: September 5
|- style="background:#cfc;"
| 33 || August 28 || Mariners || 3–2 || Heaney (2–2) || Margevicius (1–2) || Buttrey (4) || 11–22 || W2
|- style="background:#cfc;"
| 34 || August 29 || Mariners || 16–3 || Bundy (4–2) || Sheffield (2–3) || — || 12–22 || W3
|- style="background:#fbb;"
| 35 || August 30 || Mariners || 1–2  || Williams (1–1) || Quijada (0–1) || Ramírez (1) || 12–23 || L1
|- style="background:#fbb;"
| 36 || August 31 || Mariners || 1–2 || Gonzales (4–2) || Andriese (1–2) || — || 12–24 || L2
|-

|- style="background:#fbb;"
| 37 || September 2 || Padres || 4–11 || Hill (2–0) || Buttrey (1–2) || — || 12–25 || L3
|- style="background:#cfc;"
| 38 || September 3 || Padres || 2–0 || Heaney (3–2) || Clevinger (1–2) || Peña (1) || 13–25 || W1
|- style="background:#cfc;"
| 39 || September 4 || Astros || 6–5  || Andriese (2–2) || Raley (0–1) || — || 14–25 || W2
|- style="background:#cfc;"
| 40 || September 5  || Astros || 10–9  || Peña (3–0) || Paredes (1–2) || — || 15–25 || W3
|- style="background:#cfc;"
| 41 || September 5  || @ Astros || 7–6 || Ramirez (1–0) || Castellanos (0–1) || Buttrey (5) || 16–25 || W4
|- style="background:#cfc;"
| 42 || September 6 || Astros || 9–5 || Mayers (1–0) || Valdez (3–3) || — || 17–25 || W5
|- style="background:#fbb;"
| 43 || September 8 || @ Rangers || 1–7 || Lynn (5–2) || Heaney (3–3) || — || 17–26 || L1
|- style="background:#fbb;"
| 44 || September 9 || @ Rangers || 3–7 || King (1–0) || Teherán (0–3) || — || 17–27 || L2
|- style="background:#cfc;"
| 45 || September 10 || @ Rangers || 6–2 || Bundy (5–2) || Gibson (1–5) || — || 18–27 || W1
|- style="background:#fbb;"
| 46 || September 11 || @ Rockies || 4–8 || Bard (3–2) || Buttrey (1–3) || — || 18–28 || L1
|- style="background:#cfc;"
| 47 || September 12 || @ Rockies || 5–2  || Buttrey (2–3) || Kinley (0–2) || Andriese (1) || 19–28 || W1
|- style="background:#cfc;"
| 48 || September 13 || @ Rockies || 5–3 || Heaney (4–3) || Estévez (1–3) || Andriese (2) || 20–28 || W2
|- style="background:#fbb;"
| 49 || September 15 || Diamondbacks || 8–9 || Mella (1–0) || Andriese (2–3) || Crichton (2) || 20–29 || L1
|- style="background:#fbb;"
| 50 || September 16 || Diamondbacks || 6–9 || Clarke (2–0) || Bundy (5–3) || Crichton (3) || 20–30 || L2
|- style="background:#cfc;"
| 51 || September 17 || Diamondbacks || 7–3 || Canning (1–3) || Young (2–4) || — || 21–30 || W1
|- style="background:#cfc;"
| 52 || September 18 || Rangers || 6–2 || Barría (1–0) || Benjamin (1–1) || — || 22–30 || W2
|- style="background:#cfc;"
| 53 || September 19 || Rangers || 4–3 || Mayers (2–0) || Martin (0–1) || — || 23–30 || W3
|- style="background:#fbb;"
| 54 || September 20 || Rangers || 2–7 || Cody (1–1) || Teherán (0–4) || — || 23–31 || L1
|- style="background:#cfc;"
| 55 || September 21 || Rangers || 8–5 || Bundy (6–3) || Gibson (2–6) || Mayers (1) || 24–31 || W1
|- style="background:#cfc;"
| 56 || September 22 || @ Padres || 4–2 || Canning (2–3) || Davies (7–4) || Mayers (2) || 25–31 || W2
|- style="background: #cfc;"
| 57 || September 23 || @ Padres || 5–2 || Sandoval (1-4) || Morejón (2-2) || Peña (2) || 26–31 || W3
|- style="background:#fbb;"
| 58 || September 25 || @ Dodgers || 5–9 || Graterol (1–2) || Andriese (2–4) || — || 26–32 || L1
|- style="background:#fbb;"
| 59 || September 26 || @ Dodgers || 6–7 || Gonsolin (2–2) || Robles (0–2) || Kolarek (1) || 26–33 || L2
|- style="background:#fbb;"
| 60 || September 27 || @ Dodgers || 0–5 || May (3–1) || Sandoval (1–5) || — || 26–34 || L3
|-

|- style="text-align:center;"
| Legend:       = Win       = Loss       = PostponementBold = Angels team member

Season standings

American League West

American League Leaders

Record against opponents

Roster

Farm system

All coaches and rosters can be found on each team's website.

See also
Los Angeles Angels
Angel Stadium

References

External links
Los Angeles Angels Official Site
2020 Los Angeles Angels season at Baseball Reference

Los Angeles Angels seasons
Los Angeles Angels
Los Angeles Angels